Leonid Mikhaylovich Osipov (6 February 1943 – 5 November 2020) was a Russian water polo player who competed for the Soviet Union in the 1964, 1968 and in the 1972 Summer Olympics.

See also
 Soviet Union men's Olympic water polo team records and statistics
 List of Olympic champions in men's water polo
 List of Olympic medalists in water polo (men)
 List of World Aquatics Championships medalists in water polo

References

External links
 

1943 births
2020 deaths
Soviet male water polo players
Russian male water polo players
Olympic water polo players of the Soviet Union
Water polo players at the 1964 Summer Olympics
Water polo players at the 1968 Summer Olympics
Water polo players at the 1972 Summer Olympics
Olympic gold medalists for the Soviet Union
Olympic silver medalists for the Soviet Union
Olympic bronze medalists for the Soviet Union
Olympic medalists in water polo
Sportspeople from Moscow
Medalists at the 1972 Summer Olympics
Medalists at the 1968 Summer Olympics
Medalists at the 1964 Summer Olympics
Moscow State University alumni